Epactosaris is a genus of moths of the family Yponomeutidae.

Species
Epactosaris longipalpella - Rebel, 1907

References

Yponomeutidae